Ryan Miller (born 1980) is a former ice hockey goaltender who last played for the Anaheim Ducks.

Ryan Miller may also refer to:

Ryan Miller (musician) (born 1972), lead singer and guitar player for the band Guster
Ryan Miller (soccer) (born 1984), professional soccer player
Ryan Miller (American football) (born 1989), offensive lineman
Ryan Miller (cyclist), rides for Toyota-United Pro Cycling Team, see United States National Team Pursuit Championships
Ryan Miller (basketball coach) (born 1975), American basketball coach
Archie Miller (basketball) (Ryan Joseph Miller, born 1978), American college basketball coach and former player

See also
Ryan Millar (born 1978), American volleyball player
Ryan Millar (footballer), Scottish footballer
Ryan Millar (rugby league) (born 1994), English rugby league player